Aleksandr Fyodorovich Rittikh or Alexander Rittich (1831 — 1914?) was an Imperial Russian general, cartographer, ethnographer and journalist, adherent of the Panslavism. Father of Aleksandr Aleksandrovich Rittikh.

Works 

 "Atlas of population of the West Russian region of confessions" 1862-1864
 "The ethnographic map of the Slavic peoples" (St. Petersburg, 1874),
 "Ethnographic Map of European Russia" (St. Petersburg, 1875),
 "The ethnographic map of the Caucasus" (St. Petersburg, 1875),
 "Slavic world" (text and 42 maps, Warsaw, 1885),
 "Materials for the Ethnography of the Kingdom of Poland: Lublin province, and the August" (St. Petersburg, 1864),
 "Materials for the Ethnography of Russia: Kazan Province" (Kazan, 1870),
 "Materials for the Ethnography of Russia: the Baltic Region" (St. Petersburg, 1875),
 "Austria-Hungary, the overall statistics" (St. Petersburg, 1874),
 "Apercu general des travaux ethnographiques en Russie pendant les trente dernieres annees" (Kharkov, 1878),
 "The numerical ratio of the sexes in Russia" (Kharkiv, 1879),
 "Ethnographic sketch of the Kharkov province" (Kharkiv, 1879),
 "Removal" (Kharkiv, 1882),
 "The Jewish question in Kharkov" (Kharkiv, 1882),
 "Ce que vaut la Russie pour la France" (Paris, 1887)
 "The Russian military life" (St. Petersburg, 1893)
 "Russian trade and navigation in the Baltic Sea" (St. Petersburg, 1896)
 "The Slavs in the Varangian Sea" (St. Petersburg, 1897)
 "Czechia and Czechs" (St. Petersburg, 1897)
 "Current issues of nobility" (St. Petersburg, 1897)
 "French-Slavic Congress in Paris in 1900" (St. Petersburg, 1899)
 "Eastern Question" (political-ethnographic essay, St. Petersburg, 1898)
 "Four lectures on Russian Ethnography" (St. Petersburg, 1895)

References

Imperial Russian Army generals
Politicians of the Russian Empire
1831 births
Year of death missing